The Ministry of Foreign Affairs and International Cooperation is the foreign policy department of the Government of Sierra Leone.

The department issues Sierra Leonean visas to foreign nationals before visiting Sierra Leone, except foreign nationals of Economic Community of West African States (ECOWAS) States who do not require visas to visit other ECOWAS nations. All of Sierra Leone embassies abroad are part of the Ministry.

The Ministry's building is located in the capital Freetown, Sierra Leone. The Ministry is headed by the Minister of Foreign Affairs, who is appointed by the president of Sierra Leone and must be confirmed by the parliament of Sierra Leone before taking office. The Sierra Leone president has the constitutional authority to sack the Minister of Foreign Affairs at any time. The current Sierra Leone minister of Foreign Affairs and International Cooperation is Samura Kamara.

Duties
The duties of the Minister include:
In charge of Sierra Leone Foreign policies
Advises the president on Foreign policy issues
Speak and lobby on the interest of Sierra Leone
Gives or reject Visa to Foreign national visiting Sierra Leone, except citizens of Ecowas nations, who do not require visas
Supervises Sierra Leone's embassies abroad; and supervises activities of Sierra Leonean diplomats
Represent the Government of Sierra Leone in other country's
maintains relations with other country's and international organizations
Represent Sierra Leoneans in Foreign country's
Gives basic information about other country's to Sierra Leoneans

Here is a list of Sierra Leone's Foreign Ministers:

 John Karefa-Smart (1961–64)
 Cyril B. Rogers-Wright (1964–65)
 Maigore Kallon (1965–67)(1996)
 Leslie William Leigh (1967–68)
 Luseni A.M. Brewah (1968–69)
 Cyril Foray (1969–71)
 Solomon Athanasius James Pratt (1971–73)
 Desmond Luke (1973–75)
 Francis Minah (1975–77)
 Abdulai Conteh (1977–84)
 Sheka Hassan Kanu (1984–85)
 Abdul Karim Koroma (1985–92)
 Ahmed Ramadan Dumbuya (1992)(2001–02)
 Mohamed Lamin Kamara (1992–93)
 Karefa Kargbo (1993–94)
 Abass Bundu (1994–95)
 Alusine Fofanah (1995–96)
 Shirley Gbujama (1996–97)
 Lousin Chaluba (1996)
 Paolo Bangura (1997–98)
 Sama Banya (?-2001)
 Ahmed Ramadan Dumbuya (2nd time) (2001–02)
 Momodu Koroma (2002–07)
 Zainab Bangura (2007–10)
 J. B. Dauda (2010–2012)
 Samura Kamara (2012–2017)
 Kaifala Marah (2017–2021)
 David J. Francis (2021–present)

References

External links
 

Government departments of Sierra Leone
1960 establishments in Sierra Leone